The CHI Academy is a group of researchers honored by SIGCHI, the Special Interest Group in Computer–Human Interaction of the Association for Computing Machinery. Each year, 5–8 new members are elected for having made a significant, cumulative contributions to the development of the
field of human–computer interaction and have influenced the research of others.

Inductees by year 

Here are the inductees into the CHI Academy by year:

See also

 List of computer science awards

References

External links 
 SIGCHI Awards

Association for Computing Machinery
Computer science awards